HMNZS Tui, formerly USNS Charles H. Davis (T-AGOR-5), was one of nine Conrad class oceanographic ships built for the United States Navy (USN), that later saw service in the Royal New Zealand Navy (RNZN). Serving with the USN from 1963 to 1970, these ships were designed to perform acoustic experiments on sound transmission underwater, and for gravity, magnetism and deep-ocean floor studies.

The ship was recommissioned into the RNZN in late 1970, and as HMNZS Tui served as an oceanographic survey and research ship until her decommissioning in 1997. In 1999, the ship was scuttled as a dive wreck.

Construction 
The fourth ship to be so named by the Navy, Charles H. Davis (T-AGOR-5) was laid down by Christy Corporation, Sturgeon Bay, Wisconsin, 30 June 1962; launched 30 June 1962; sponsored by Mrs. Roy Alexander Gano, wife of Admiral Roy Alexander Gano, Commander MSTS; delivered to the Navy 25 January 1963 and turned over to the Military Sea Transportation Service (MSTS) 25 January 1963.

Operational history

USN

RNZN 
In 1970, she was transferred to the RNZN, and was commissioned on 11 September 1970 as HMNZS Tui. Tui was named after the Tui bird, and was the second of two ships with this name to serve in the RNZN.

After a partial refit and the installation and testing of scientific equipment, Tui began a program of work for the Defence Scientific Establishment in Auckland. For years Tui went unobtrusively about the kind of work she was designed for, primarily underwater acoustics.

Tui worked in Australian, Indian Ocean and South Pacific waters. She worked on Auckland University research, with DSIR scientists, and with other oceanographic ships. Tui also took part in several American research programs. Her acoustic research was mainly to do with the detection and tracking of submarines.

During the 1970s she made an extensive search for the Maria Theresa Reef.

Decommissioning and fate 
In 1997, Tui was decommissioned and was replaced by the hydrographic ship HMNZS Resolution.

In February 1999, Tui was scuttled  from Tutukaka Heads to serve as a tourist attraction and wreck for divers, following a period of work on her which removed any objects in danger of breaking free and welding shut any areas that may have posed a hazard for wreck divers. Her anchor was presented to the City of Napier.

See also 
 Survey ships of the Royal New Zealand Navy

Notes

References 
 McDougall, R J  (1989) New Zealand Naval Vessels. Page 115–116. Government Printing Office.

External links 
 HMNZS Tui (Oceanographic Vessel)

 

 

Charles H. Davis
Ships built in Sturgeon Bay, Wisconsin
1962 ships
Ships transferred from the United States Navy to the Royal New Zealand Navy
Robert D. Conrad-class oceanographic research ships of the Royal New Zealand Navy
Shipwrecks of the Northland Region